Kpeve New Town is a small town located in Kpeve, which is also the capital of South Dayi district, a district in the Volta Region of Ghana.

See also
 South Dayi (Ghana parliament constituency)

References

External links
 South Dayi District on GhanaDistricts.com

Populated places in the Volta Region